Shake Me to Wake Me is a contemporary Christian music album by Steve Camp, released by Sparrow Records in 1985.

Track listing 

All songs written by Steve Camp and Rob Frazier, except where noted.

"Help is on the Way" (Camp, Carol Buckley-Frazier) - 4:08
"Lazy Jane" - 3:20
"Surrender Your Heart"; Duet with Suzanne Norman - 4:44
"Bad News for Modern Man" (Camp) - 4:57 
"Stranger to Holiness" - 4:24
"On the Edge" - 3:52
"Asleep in the Light" (Keith Green) - 4:01
"Shake Me to Wake Me" - 4:32 
"Going Through the Motions" - 4:07 
"Even Now" - 3:59

Personnel 

 Steve Camp – lead and backing vocals, backing vocal arrangements
 Alan Pasqua – keyboards
 James Newton Howard – synthesizers
 Rhett Lawrence – synthesizers, Fairlight programming
 Smitty Price – synthesizers
 John Rosasco – synthesizers, synthesizer arrangements
 Dann Huff – guitar
 Michael Landau – guitar, lead guitar solo
 Dave Perkins – lead guitar solo
 Neil Stubenhaus – bass
 Paul Leim – drums, LinnDrum programming
 Jim Horn – saxophone
 Susie Allanson – backing vocals
 Carol Buckley-Frazier – backing vocals,
 Rob Frazier – backing vocals, BGV arrangements
 Marty McCall – backing vocals
 Gary Pigg – backing vocals
 Suzanne Norman – lead vocals (3)

Production

 Steve Camp – producer, mixing
 Rob Frazier – lead vocal producer
 John Rosasco – lead vocal producer
 Steve Wyer – executive producer, management
 Terry Christian – engineer, mixing
 Dan Garcia – assistant engineer
 Chris Hammond – assistant engineer
 Bill Heath – assistant engineer
 Alan Henry – assistant engineer
 Randy Holland – assistant engineer
 Peggy McCreary – assistant engineer
 Dan Mundhenk – assistant engineer
 Willie Pevear – assistant engineer
 Stephen Shelton – assistant engineer
 Sunset Sound, Hollywood, California – recording and mixing location
 Sunset Sound Factory, Los Angeles, California – overdub location
 Bill Schnee Studios, North Hollywood, California – overdub location
 Weddington Studios, North Hollywood, California – overdub location
 Bullet Recording, Nashville, Tennessee – overdub location
 Steve Hall – mastering
 Herb Melton – mastering
 Future Disc, Hollywood, California – mastering location
 Raul Vega – photography

References 

1985 albums
Steve Camp albums
Sparrow Records albums